The 2021 Burnley Borough Council election took place on 6 May 2021 to elect members of Burnley Borough Council in England. This election was held on the same day as other local elections. As with many other local elections in England, it was postponed from May 2020, due to the COVID-19 pandemic. One third of the council was up for election, and each successful candidate will serve a three-year term of office, expiring in 2024. These seats were last contested in 2016.

Following the 2019 election, a coalition executive was formed by all the other parties after Labour lost control of the council. Led by Alan Hosker UKIP had collected all three seats in Hapton with Park ward after 2019. Its three councillors joined the Conservative group in 2020 with Hosker later being elected as group leader. A rupture occurred within the Conservative group later in the year, amidst Hosker's attempts to obtain a position on the executive for himself. This precipitated the collapse of the coalition in September 2020, with Labour's Mark Townsend temporally returning to the role of Council leader in a minority administration, but expected to stand down after the election to become Mayor.

Andrew Newhouse, who won Cliviger with Worsthorne for the Conservatives in 2016, defected to the Burnley and Padiham Independent Party shortly afterward. Bill Brindle, who won Coalclough and Deerplay for the Lib Dems in 2016 but (along with his wife) joined the Labour group in 2018, decided to retire rather than stand again. Mark Payne, who won Gannow for the Lib Dems in 2016, was one of the councillors who left the party over its stance on Brexit to form the Burnley and Padiham Independent Party in 2017. David Roper (Whittlefield with Ightenhill) who also left the party at that time but continued as an independent, was another who did not stand for re-election.

After the election the council remained in no overall control, with Labour's Afrasiab Anwar taking over from Mark Townsend as council leader in a coalition with the Lib Dems.

State of the Parties 
After the election, the composition of the council (compared with May 2019) was:

Election results

Overall election result

Ward results

Bank Hall

Briercliffe

Brunshaw

Cliviger and Worsthorne

Coalclough and Deerplay

Daneshouse and Stoneyholme

Gannow

Gawthorpe

Hapton with Park

Lanehead

Queensgate

Rosegrove with Lowerhouse

Rosehill with Burnley Wood

Trinity

Whittlefield with Ightenhill

References

Burnley
2021
2020s in Lancashire
May 2021 events in the United Kingdom